Div castle is a historical castle located in Meshgin Shahr County in Ardabil Province, The longevity of this fortress dates back to the Urartu.

References 

Castles in Iran